WNTY (990 AM) is an oldies radio station licensed to Southington, Connecticut and serving the Hartford, Connecticut area. The station is owned by John Fuller, through licensee Red Wolf Broadcasting Corporation, and broadcasts with 2.5 kilowatts daytime and 80 watts nighttime from a studio and tower site on Old Turnpike Road in Southington.

History
After WBZY was shut down, it was applied in 1964 but license wasn’t completely transferred until 1966. First went on September 2, 1969, initially as a daytime-only radio station, WNTY's original format would continue in some form until early 1999 when the death of then-owner Donato F. Sarapo, who had purchased the station from the original owners, led to WNTY being sold to ADD Radio Group for $850,000.

La Brava 990
In April 1999, WNTY was leased by Hartford-based El Principe Communications.La Brava would last until September 15, 2000 when ADD Radio terminated El Principe's lease for reasons including non-payment of rent. In retaliation, El Principe vandalized WNTY's studios and transmitter which kept the station off the air for two weeks. The station would return to the air that October with an automated variety of music plus high school football and the Sunday brokered programming, as well as a Christian music program "Play it Again God" targeted at Christian youth and young adults.

Xact Radio, 990 The X
In April 2003, the 990 frequency would see a big change on paper as the WNTY calls were cast aside after 34 years and replaced by new calls of WXCT, chosen for the new slogan of Xact Radio, 990 The X.

Spanish-language religion
On Tuesday May 8, 2007, it was announced that WXCT would be dropping its all-talk format and flipping to a foreign language format on Friday, May 11.  WXCT officially switched to Spanish-language religious programming at 3:30 p.m. on Thursday, May 10, 2007.

Kool Oldies
Following the acquisition of the station from Connoisseur in 2015 , the station entered into a three-way Kool Oldies Radio simulcast with WACM (AM) and WSKP (AM).

Translators

References

External links

Southington, Connecticut
Mass media in New Haven County, Connecticut
NTY
Oldies radio stations in the United States
Radio stations established in 1969
1969 establishments in Connecticut